Anthony Therrien (born December 17, 1997) is a Canadian actor from Charlemagne, Quebec. He is most noted for his performances in the films Fake Tattoos (Les faux tatouages), for which he was a Vancouver Film Critics Circle nominee for Best Actor in a Canadian Film at the Vancouver Film Critics Circle Awards 2017, and Slut in a Good Way (Charlotte a du fun), for which he received a Prix Iris nomination for Best Supporting Actor at the 20th Quebec Cinema Awards in 2018.

He has also appeared in the films The Torrent (Le Torrent), Corbo, 1:54, Miséricorde and Vieux Jeu, and the television series Faux départs and Alerte amber.

References

External links

1997 births
21st-century Canadian male actors
Canadian male film actors
Canadian male television actors
Male actors from Quebec
People from Charlemagne, Quebec
French Quebecers
Living people